Live in Germany 1993 is the second live album and DVD by Welsh singer Bonnie Tyler, recorded in Frankfurt in 1993 and released in 2011, with remastered audio.

After several postponed release dates, ZYX Music released the album in three formats; a CD, a DVD, and a CD/DVD Deluxe Edition.

The concert was originally broadcast on German TV in 1993, entitled Live aus der Schlachter - In Concert. The concert featured a cut version of "Lovers Again" while the credits played, but was too short to be added to the CD, but was added to the DVD. Finally, the concert also featured versions of "God Gave Love to You" and "Bitterblue", which were not added to the DVD or CD.

In 2012, the DVD was re-released by Essential Distribution (Essential Music) in South Africa with a new artwork design.

Track listing

Re-release
ZYX Music released Live & Lost in France on May 10, 2013. This CD/DVD release is a re-issue.

References

Bonnie Tyler live albums
2011 live albums
Bonnie Tyler video albums
2011 video albums
Live video albums
ZYX Music albums